Larry Crane (October 8, 1956) is an American rock musician and songwriter from Seymour, Indiana.  From 1976 until 1991, he appeared alongside John Mellencamp as guitarist and contributor to the arrangements and production of the Mellencamp sound (often labelled as "heartland rock.")

History
As Mellencamp's guitarist, Crane contributed to twenty Billboard charted singles, including "Ain't Even Done With The Night", "Hurts So Good", "Jack and Diane", "Hand to Hold on To", "I Need a Lover", "Crumblin' Down", "Pink Houses", "Rain on the Scarecrow", "Small Town", "Lonely Ol' Night", "Rumbleseat", "R.O.C.K in the U.S.A.", "Paper in Fire", "Check It Out", "Cherry Bomb", "Martha Say", "Jackie Brown", and "Pop Singer". Though not often recognized as a songwriter, Crane did receive a co-writer credit for "Play Guitar" on the Uh-Huh album.

After the release of Big Daddy, Crane left the Mellencamp band due to his impression that "he and his band mates were underpaid."  Since leaving the band, Crane has launched a solo career.  During his thirty-plus year career, he has also toured and recorded with several other influential musicians, including John Prine, Steve Earle, Bonnie Raitt, Rosanne Cash, Carl Perkins, James McMurtry, Mitch Ryder, Lou Reed, and John Fogerty.  He has also collaborated with legendary producer Bob Johnston.

Discography

Solo recordings

Recordings with John Mellencamp

Other recordings 

 'Time to pay (film)
 Falling from Grace, 1992

References

1956 births
Living people
people from Seymour, Indiana
American rock guitarists
American male guitarists
Songwriters from Indiana
Guitarists from Indiana
20th-century American guitarists
20th-century American male musicians
American male songwriters